Jackie Richardson  (born January 4, 1947) is a Canadian singer and actress. Richardson is known for her screen roles in Turning to Stone, The Gospel According to the Blues, The Doodlebops, and Sins of the Father. She is also known for her appearance on the YTV show Catwalk where she played the grandmother to Atlas (Christopher Lee Clements).

Early life
Richardson was born in Donora, Pennsylvania in 1947, and is of African-American descent. In 1954, Richardson moved with her family to Toronto.

Career 
Richardson was a member of 1960s Toronto-based girl group The Tiaras along with Brenda Russell, Arlene Trotman, and Colina Phillips.

Richardson is a three-time nominee for the Academy of Canadian Cinema and Television Gemini Award, and won the Gemini Award for Best Performance by an Actress in a Leading Role in a Dramatic Program or Mini-Series for The Gospel According to the Blues. In 2003 she was nominated for the NAACP Image Award for Best Actress in a Television Movie for Sins of the Father. Richardson is also a noted stage performer, winning a Dora Award in 2004 for the musical Cookin' at the Cookery. Other high-profile projects include Milk and Honey, More Tales of the City, Further Tales of the City, Hey Lady! and 3 Men and a Baby.

The musical Big Mama! The Willie Mae Thornton Story was conceived of and written by Audrei-Kairen Kotaska for Richardson, who starred in the production first in 1999 and then again in 2012.

In 2017, Richardson won the Martin Luther King Jr. Achievement Award for her theater and music achievements.

Personal life 
Her daughter, Kim Richardson, is also a singer.

Filmography

Film

Television

References

External links

American emigrants to Canada
Canadian film actresses
Canadian television actresses
Canadian musical theatre actresses
Canadian gospel singers
Canadian blues singers
Canadian women jazz singers
Canadian people of African-American descent
Actresses from Toronto
Black Canadian actresses
20th-century Black Canadian women singers
Living people
Musicians from Toronto
People from Donora, Pennsylvania
Canadian Screen Award winners
Place of birth missing (living people)
Dora Mavor Moore Award winners
Canadian children's television personalities
Canadian children's musicians
1947 births
21st-century Black Canadian women singers
Honorary Members of the Order of Canada
People from Thornhill, Ontario